Caleb Baker (1762 – June 26, 1849) was an American politician and a U.S. representative from New York.

Biography
Born in Providence in the Rhode Island Colony, Baker moved to New York in 1790; studied law, was admitted to the bar and began practicing. He married Sarah Stull and they had two children, Brockholst L Baker and Ruth M Baker Hamilton.  He resided in the towns of Chemung, Ashland, and Newtown (now Elmira), Tioga County from 1790 to 1836. These towns are now in Chemung County, due to the partitioning of Tioga County. He moved to and lived in Southport, Chemung County, from 1836 until his death.

Career
Baker served as assessor of the town of Chemung in 1791.  He taught school in Wellsburg, Chemung County, in 1803 and 1804.  He was appointed surrogate of Tioga County on April 7, 1806, April 13, 1825, and again in 1829.  He was appointed judge of the Court of Common Pleas in 1810, and served as member of the New York State Assembly in 1814, 1815, and again in 1829.  He was a Justice of the Peace of the town of Chemung in 1816.

Elected as a Democratic-Republican to the Sixteenth Congress, Baker served as the U. S. representative for the twentieth district of New York from March 4, 1819 to March 3, 1821.

Death
Baker died in Southport, New York (now a part of Elmira) on June 26, 1849 (age about 86 years). He is interred at Fitzsimmons Cemetery, Elmira, New York.

References

External links

1762 births
1849 deaths
Politicians from Providence, Rhode Island
New York (state) state court judges
Members of the New York State Assembly
Democratic-Republican Party members of the United States House of Representatives from New York (state)